Sam Benedict is an American legal drama that aired on NBC from September 1962 to March 1963. The series was created and executive produced by E. Jack Neuman. The character Sam Benedict is based on real-life lawyer Jake Ehrlich, who served as technical consultant for the series.

Plot

Guest stars
Inger Stevens
Vera Miles
Fred Aldrich
Elizabeth Ashley
Phyllis Avery
Larry Blyden
Spencer Chan
Sidney Clute
Fred Coby
Hazel Court
Yvonne Craig
Howard Duff
Ross Elliott, four episodes as Marty Rhodes
Stefan Gierasch
Sam Gilman
Gloria Grahame
Ellen Holly
Marsha Hunt
Diana Hyland
Jean Inness
Ray Kellogg
Nancy Kelly
Jess Kirkpatrick
Otto Kruger
Elizabeth MacRae
Joyce Meadows
Burgess Meredith
Gary Merrill
John Nolan
Richard O'Brien
Maria Palmer
Michael Parks
Joseph V. Perry
Claude Rains
Ruth Roman
Joseph Schildkraut
Barbara Stuart
Kelly Thordsen
George Tobias

Episode list

Disclaimer in end credits
"Sam Benedict is based on the real living character of J. W. (Jake) Ehrlich but the stories are fictional."

Home media
On November 22, 2016, Warner Bros. released Sam Benedict – The Complete Series on DVD via their Warner Archive Collection.  This is a manufacture-on-demand (MOD) release, available through Warner's online store and Amazon.com.

References and notes

External links 
 

1962 American television series debuts
1963 American television series endings
American legal drama television series
Black-and-white American television shows
English-language television shows
NBC original programming
Television series by MGM Television
Television shows set in San Francisco